The meridian 21° east of Greenwich is a line of longitude that extends from the North Pole across the Arctic Ocean, the Atlantic Ocean, Europe, Africa, the Indian Ocean, the Southern Ocean, and Antarctica to the South Pole.

The 21st meridian east forms a great circle with the 159th meridian west.

Part of Namibia's border with Botswana is defined by the meridian.

From Pole to Pole
Starting at the North Pole and heading south to the South Pole, the 21st meridian east passes through:

{| class="wikitable plainrowheaders"
! scope="col" width="125" | Co-ordinates
! scope="col" | Country, territory or sea
! scope="col" | Notes
|-
| style="background:#b0e0e6;" | 
! scope="row" style="background:#b0e0e6;" | Arctic Ocean
| style="background:#b0e0e6;" |
|-
| 
! scope="row" | 
| Svalbard - island of Tavleøya
|-
| style="background:#b0e0e6;" | 
! scope="row" style="background:#b0e0e6;" | Arctic Ocean
| style="background:#b0e0e6;" |
|-
| 
! scope="row" | 
| Svalbard - island of Nordaustlandet
|-
| style="background:#b0e0e6;" | 
! scope="row" style="background:#b0e0e6;" | Barents Sea
| style="background:#b0e0e6;" |
|-valign="top"
| 
! scope="row" | 
| Svalbard - islands of Bastian Insel, Spitsbergen, Barentsøya and Edgeøya
|-
| style="background:#b0e0e6;" | 
! scope="row" style="background:#b0e0e6;" | Barents Sea
| style="background:#b0e0e6;" |
|-
| 
! scope="row" | 
| Svalbard - island of Edgeøya
|-
| style="background:#b0e0e6;" | 
! scope="row" style="background:#b0e0e6;" | Barents Sea
| style="background:#b0e0e6;" |
|-
| style="background:#b0e0e6;" | 
! scope="row" style="background:#b0e0e6;" | Atlantic Ocean
| style="background:#b0e0e6;" | Norwegian Sea
|-
| 
! scope="row" | 
| Islands of Skjervøya, Kågen and the mainland
|-
| 
! scope="row" | 
|
|-
| 
! scope="row" | 
|
|-valign="top"
| style="background:#b0e0e6;" | 
! scope="row" style="background:#b0e0e6;" | Baltic Sea
| style="background:#b0e0e6;" | Gulf of Bothnia, passing just east of the Holmöarna islands,  and passing just west of the island of Replot and the mainland, 
|-
| 
! scope="row" | 
| Numerous islands
|-
| style="background:#b0e0e6;" | 
! scope="row" style="background:#b0e0e6;" | Baltic Sea
| style="background:#b0e0e6;" |
|-
| 
! scope="row" | 
| Passing through Liepāja
|-
| style="background:#b0e0e6;" | 
! scope="row" style="background:#b0e0e6;" | Baltic Sea
| style="background:#b0e0e6;" |
|-
| 
! scope="row" | 
| Curonian Spit
|-
| style="background:#b0e0e6;" | 
! scope="row" style="background:#b0e0e6;" | Curonian Lagoon
| style="background:#b0e0e6;" |
|-
| 
! scope="row" | 
| Kaliningrad Oblast (exclave)
|-
| 
! scope="row" | 
| Passing through Warsaw
|-
| 
! scope="row" | 
|
|-
| 
! scope="row" | 
|
|-
| 
! scope="row" | 
|
|-
| 
! scope="row" | 
| passing near cities of Smederevo and Kragujevac, passing through Trstenik
|-valign="top"
| 
! scope="row" |  or 
| Kosovo is a partially recognised state. Some nations consider its territory to be part of Serbia.
|-
| 
! scope="row" | 
|
|-
| style="background:#b0e0e6;" | 
! scope="row" style="background:#b0e0e6;" | Lake Prespa
| style="background:#b0e0e6;" |
|-
| 
! scope="row" | 
| For about 8 km
|-
| 
! scope="row" | 
|
|-
| 
! scope="row" | 
| Passing through the Ambracian Gulf
|-
| style="background:#b0e0e6;" | 
! scope="row" style="background:#b0e0e6;" | Mediterranean Sea
| style="background:#b0e0e6;" | Ionian Sea, passing just east of the island of Zakynthos
|-
| 
! scope="row" | 
| Strofades islands
|-
| style="background:#b0e0e6;" | 
! scope="row" style="background:#b0e0e6;" | Mediterranean Sea
| style="background:#b0e0e6;" |
|-
| 
! scope="row" | 
|
|-
| 
! scope="row" | 
|
|-
| 
! scope="row" | 
|
|-valign="top"
| 
! scope="row" | 
|
|-
| 
! scope="row" | 
|
|-
| 
! scope="row" | 
|
|-
| 
! scope="row" |  /  border
|
|-
| 
! scope="row" | 
|
|-valign="top"
| 
! scope="row" | 
| Northern Cape Western Cape
|-
| style="background:#b0e0e6;" | 
! scope="row" style="background:#b0e0e6;" | Indian Ocean
| style="background:#b0e0e6;" |
|-
| style="background:#b0e0e6;" | 
! scope="row" style="background:#b0e0e6;" | Southern Ocean
| style="background:#b0e0e6;" |
|-
| 
! scope="row" | Antarctica
| Queen Maud Land, claimed by 
|-
|}

See also
20th meridian east
22nd meridian east

e021 meridian east
Botswana–Namibia border